Ruisseau-De Montigny Nature Park is a large nature park in the Rivière-des-Prairies neighbourhood of the Rivière-des-Prairies–Pointe-aux-Trembles borough of Montreal, Quebec, Canada. 

It is located on the banks of the Rivière des Prairies. Most of the park is located in the western sector of the borough Rivière-des-Prairies–Pointe-aux-Trembles (Rivière-des-Prairies neighbourhood), with a small portion located in the eastern sector of the borough of Anjou.

Ruisseau-De Montigny Nature Park is a linear park, and is located between Perras Boulevard and Henri-Bourassa Boulevard, west of Louis-Hippolyte-Lafontaine Boulevard. The park borrows its name from a stream flowing through it from south to north, emptying into the Rivière des Prairies.

It includes  of trails, and four small islands.

A count of the wildlife in the park indicated the presence of 62 species of birds and a dozen different species of mammals.

History
Before its opening of the park, a major cleanup was required to clean the stream and the surrounding woodland, which were previously used to deposit waste for several years.

In January 2011, the city of Montreal adopted a plan for the development of green space also known as the "De Montigny Stream Basin Eco-territory", in order to improve access to the public. The city also aims to better protect the park, particularly against negative impacts that may occur as a result of the opening of the nearby Olivier-Charbonneau Bridge.

References

External links
  (Montreal's Nature Parks)

Parks in Montreal
Rivière-des-Prairies–Pointe-aux-Trembles
Anjou, Quebec
Protected areas established in 2005
2005 establishments in Quebec